Queersicht is a LGBTIAQ+ film festival held in Bern, Switzerland. Founded in 1997, it is the oldest film festival for LGBTIAQ+ movies in Switzerland. Originally founded in the autonomous youth and culture center Reitschule in Bern, it is today an independent association. The festival is organized by a volunteer committee and funded by the city and canton of Bern and differen private sponsors. The festival attracts about 3,000 spectators each year. Due to COVID the 25th anniversary had to be postponed to 2022.

The name is a pun on the words queer and quer, which means across in German. The name could thus be loosely translated as "crossview".

See also
 List of LGBT film festivals

External links
 http://www.queersicht.ch/
 gay art magazine Articles about contemporary gay art today
 gay art forum: forums for gay and lesbians painters, photographers and comics artists

Film festivals in Switzerland
LGBT events in Switzerland
LGBT film festivals
Culture in Bern
Film festivals established in 1997
1997 establishments in Switzerland
LGBT festivals in Europe